723 Hammonia is a minor planet orbiting the Sun. It was discovered in 1911 and is named after the city of Hamburg. Although the name alludes to Hamburg it was discovered in Vienna. (Vienna is the capital of Austria)

The asteroid was discovered by the noted and prolific astronomer Johann Palisa. He worked from Pola early in his career and later from Vienna observatories. The same night he discovered Hammonia, he also discovered 724 Hapag and 725 Amanda. He discovered dozens and dozens of asteroids between 1874 and 1923, ranging from 136 Austria to 1073 Gellivara.

As seen from a certain area on Earth, 723 Hammonia occulted the star 3UC149-190572 on June 3, 2013.

In 2014 it was noted to have a high-albedo and amorphous Mg pyroxenes was suggested as a possible reason for this.

See also
 449 Hamburga (another asteroid named after Hamburg)
 Vienna Observatory

References

External links
 
 

Background asteroids
Hammonia
Hammonia
C-type asteroids (SMASS)
19111021